Kisutam syllis, also known by its common name sky-blue groundstreak is a species from the genus Kisutam. The species was originally described by Frederick DuCane Godman and Osbert Salvin in 1887.

Description
Kisutam syllis is one of the most common eumaeine species. The species can often be found around decaying fruit on wet forest floors, where they are detrivores

Distribution
Like the others species in the genus  Kisutam, K. sullis has been observed from Mexico to southern Brazil. This range is confirmed by observations from citizen scientists.

References

Fauna of Suriname
Eumaeini